Town–Hollister Farm is a historic home and farm complex located at North Granville in Washington County, New York. The house was built about 1810 and consists of a 2-story, center entrance main block with a -story kitchen ell.  The property also includes a mid-19th-century turnpike marker, timber-frame barn, car garage, well, cow barn, machinery shed, corn crib, barn cluster, hay barn, and windmill.

It was listed on the National Register of Historic Places in 2008 and has been in the care of the Hollister family and its descendants for five generations.

References

Farms on the National Register of Historic Places in New York (state)
Houses completed in 1810
Houses in Washington County, New York
National Register of Historic Places in Washington County, New York